Diego Cobo Terrazas (born 23 November 1973) is a Mexican politician from the Ecologist Green Party of Mexico. He has served as Deputy of the LVIII and LX Legislatures of the Mexican Congress representing Veracruz.

References

1973 births
Living people
Politicians from Veracruz
Ecologist Green Party of Mexico politicians
21st-century Mexican politicians
National Autonomous University of Mexico alumni
Deputies of the LX Legislature of Mexico
Members of the Chamber of Deputies (Mexico) for Veracruz